William Banks Slaughter (April 27, 1797 – July 15, 1879) was a United States politician.

Born in Culpeper County, Virginia, Slaughter was educated at the College of William & Mary. In 1826, he moved to Bardstown, Kentucky, to read law and be admitted to the Kentucky bar. Later, he moved to Bedford, Indiana, where he practiced law and was elected to the Indiana House of Representatives. In 1832, Slaughter introduced resolutions in the Indiana General Assembly supporting President Andrew Jackson and the Nullification Crisis involving South Carolina; the resolutions passed the Indiana General Assembly. Slaughter was appointed Register of the Land Office by President Jackson in Indianapolis, Indiana, and was transferred to Green Bay, which was in Michigan Territory. Slaughter was elected to the Michigan Territorial Legislature and helped with the creation and organization of the Wisconsin Territory. In 1837, President Jackson appointed Slaughter secretary of the Wisconsin Territory and he served until 1841. In 1845, Slaughter retired to Virginia, but returned to Wisconsin because of the American Civil War. He was appointed by President Abraham Lincoln to oversee the commissary and later was quartermaster at Jefferson Barracks Military Post, Missouri. In 1878, Slaughter published a book, titled Reminiscences of distinguished men. He died in Madison, Wisconsin.

Slaughter County
In 1838, a county was named in honor of William Slaughter in what is now Iowa. However, the citizens were dissatisfied with the name and the county was renamed Washington County the next year.

Notes

External links
William Banks Slaughter, Reminiscences of Distinguished Men, Published by the author, 1878.

People from Culpeper County, Virginia
People from Bedford, Indiana
People of Wisconsin in the American Civil War
Members of the Michigan Territorial Legislature
Members of the Indiana House of Representatives
Secretaries of State of Wisconsin
Writers from Virginia
Writers from Wisconsin
Washington County, Iowa
1797 births
1879 deaths
19th-century American politicians
American lawyers admitted to the practice of law by reading law